

Otto Günsche  (24 September 1917 – 2 October 2003) was a mid-ranking officer in the Waffen-SS of Nazi Germany during World War II. He was a member of the SS Division Leibstandarte before he became Adolf Hitler's personal adjutant. Günsche was taken prisoner by soldiers of the Red Army in Berlin on 2 May 1945. After being held in various prisons and labour camps in the Soviet Union, he was released from Bautzen Penitentiary on 2 May 1956.

Biography
Otto Günsche was born in Jena in Saxe-Weimar-Eisenach. After leaving secondary school at 16 he volunteered for the Leibstandarte SS Adolf Hitler and joined the Nazi Party on 1 July 1934. He first met Adolf Hitler in 1936. He was Hitler's SS adjutant from 1940 to 1941. From 1 January 1941 to 30 April 1942, he attended the SS officer's academy. He then had front-line combat service as a Panzer Grenadier company commander with the LSSAH. On 12 January 1943, Günsche became a personal adjutant for Hitler. From August 1943 to 5 February 1944, Günsche served on the Eastern Front and in France. In March 1944 he was again appointed a personal adjutant for Hitler. As a personal SS adjutant (Persönlicher Adjutant) to Hitler, Günsche was also a member of the Führerbegleitkommando which provided security protection for Hitler. During the war, one or two were always present with Hitler during the military situation conferences. He was present at the 20 July 1944 attempt to kill Hitler at the Wolf's Lair in Rastenburg. The bomb explosion burst Günsche's eardrums and caused him to receive a number of contusions.

With the end of Nazi Germany imminent, Günsche was tasked by Hitler on 30 April 1945 with ensuring the cremation of his body after his death. That afternoon, he stood guard outside the room in the Führerbunker where Hitler and Eva Braun committed suicide. After waiting a short time, Hitler's valet, Heinz Linge, opened the study door with Martin Bormann at his side. The two men entered the study with Günsche right behind them. Günsche then left the study and announced that Hitler was dead to a group in the briefing room, which included Joseph Goebbels, General Hans Krebs, and General Wilhelm Burgdorf. Günsche had the table and chairs in the study moved out of the way and blankets were laid out on the floor. Hitler and Braun's lifeless bodies were then wrapped in blankets. In accordance with Hitler's prior written and verbal instructions, his and Braun's bodies were carried up the stairs and through the bunker's emergency exit to the garden behind the Reich Chancellery to be burned. Having ensured that the corpses were burnt using petrol supplied by Hitler's chauffeur Erich Kempka, Günsche later left the Führerbunker after midnight on 1 May. On 2 May 1945, Günsche was taken prisoner by Soviet Red Army troops that were encircling the city and flown to Moscow for sharp interrogation by the NKVD.

Post-war and death
He was imprisoned in Moscow and Bautzen in East Germany and released on 2 May 1956. During imprisonment, Günsche and Linge were primary sources for Operation Myth, the biography of Hitler which was prepared for Joseph Stalin. The dossier was edited by officers of the Soviet NKVD (later superseded by the MVD, separate from the agency of the KGB, formed in 1954). The report was received by Stalin on 30 December 1949. The report was published in book form in 2005 under the title: The Hitler Book: The Secret Dossier Prepared for Stalin from the Interrogations of Hitler's Personal Aides.

Günsche died of heart failure at his home in Lohmar, North Rhine-Westphalia in 2003. He had three children. Günsche's body was cremated. His ashes were scattered into the North Sea.

See also
Downfall (2004 film), in which he was portrayed by actor Götz Otto

Awards and decorations
 Wound Badge in Silver
 Infantry Assault Badge
 Iron Cross 2nd Class
 Iron Cross 1st Class

References

Citations

Bibliography

Further reading

1917 births
2003 deaths
Military personnel from Jena
People from Saxe-Weimar-Eisenach
Nazi Party members
SS-Sturmbannführer
Adjutants of Adolf Hitler
Waffen-SS personnel
German prisoners of war in World War II held by the Soviet Union
Prisoners and detainees of East Germany
Recipients of the Iron Cross (1939), 1st class